Sanchai Ratiwatana and Sonchat Ratiwatana were the defending champions, but they lost against Pierre-Ludovic Duclos and Yang Tsung-hua in the semifinals.
Rameez Junaid and Alexander Peya won in the final  6–4, 7–5 against Duclos and Yang.

Seeds

Draw

Draw

References
 Doubles Draw
 Qualifying Draw

Busan Open Challenger Tennis - Doubles
2010 Doubles